NotiCel is an online newspaper that covers news related to Puerto Rico. The newspaper is owned by entrepreneur and former baseball player Alfredo Escalera with base operations located in San Juan. It was founded by Oscar Serrano and Omaya Sosa Pascual who also serve as Senior Content Director and Senior Managing Director, respectively.

Notes

References

Spanish-language newspapers published in Puerto Rico